Luis Echeverría Álvarez (17 January 1922 – 8 July 2022) was a Mexican lawyer, academic, and politician affiliated with the Institutional Revolutionary Party (PRI), who served as the 57th president of Mexico from 1970 to 1976. Previously, he was Secretary of the Interior from 1963 to 1969. At the time of his death in 2022, he was his country's oldest living former head of state.

His tenure as Secretary of the Interior during the Díaz Ordaz administration was marked by an increase in political repression. Dissident journalists, politicians, and activists were subjected to censorship, arbitrary arrests, torture, and extrajudicial killings. This culminated with the Tlatelolco massacre of 2 October 1968, which ruptured the Mexican student movement; Díaz Ordaz, Echeverría, and Secretary of Defense Marcelino Garcia Barragán have been considered as the intellectual authors of the massacre, in which hundreds of unarmed protestors were killed by the Mexican Army. The following year, Díaz Ordaz appointed Echeverría as his designated successor to the presidency, and he won in the 1970 general election.

Echeverría was one of the most high-profile presidents in Mexico's post-war history; he attempted to become a leader of the so-called "Third World", countries unaligned with the United States or the Soviet Union during the Cold War. He offered political asylum to Hortensia Bussi and other refugees of Augusto Pinochet's dictatorship in Chile, established diplomatic relations and a close collaboration with the People's Republic of China after visiting Beijing and meeting with Chairman Mao Zedong and Premier Zhou Enlai, and tried to use Mao's influence among Asian and African nations in an ultimately failed attempt to become Secretary-General of the United Nations. Echeverría strained relations with Israel (and American Jews) after supporting a UN resolution that condemned Zionism.

Domestically, Echeverría led the country during a period of significant economic growth, with the Mexican economy aided by high oil prices, and growing at a yearly rate of 6.1%. He aggressively promoted the development of infrastructure projects such as new maritime ports in Lázaro Cárdenas and Ciudad Madero. His presidency was also characterized by authoritarian methods (the first documented instances of death flights in Latin America occurred in Mexico under Echeverría), the 1971 Corpus Christi massacre against student protesters, the Dirty War against leftist dissent in the country (despite Echeverría adopting a left-populist rhetoric), and the economic crisis that occurred in Mexico near the end of his term. In 2006, he was indicted and ordered under house arrest for his role in the Tlatelolco and Corpus Christi massacres, but the charges against him were dismissed in 2009.

Early life
Echeverría was born in Mexico City to Rodolfo Echeverría and Catalina Álvarez on 17 January 1922. Echeverría joined the faculty of the National Autonomous University of Mexico in 1947 and taught political theory and constitutional law. He rose in the hierarchy of the Institutional Revolutionary Party (PRI) and eventually became the private secretary of the party president, .

Early political career

Secretary of the Interior
Echeverría was Deputy Secretary of the Interior during Adolfo López Mateos's presidency, with Gustavo Díaz Ordaz as Secretary of the Interior. After Díaz Ordaz left the Secretariat in November 1963 to become the presidential candidate of the PRI for the 1964 elections, Echeverría was appointed Secretary of the Interior to serve during the remainder of the López Mateos administration. Once Díaz Ordaz took office as president, he confirmed Echeverría as Secretary of the Interior, where he remained until November 1969.

Tlatelolco

Echeverría maintained a hard line against student protesters throughout 1968. Clashes between the government and protesters culminated in the Tlatelolco massacre in October 1968, a few days before the 1968 Summer Olympics were held in Mexico City.

1970 presidential succession

On 22 October 1969, Díaz Ordaz summoned Alfonso Martínez Domínguez—the PRI party president—and other party leaders to his office in Los Pinos to reveal Echeverría as his successor. Martínez Domínguez asked the president if he was sure of his decision and Díaz Ordaz replied, "Why do you ask? It's the most important decision of my life and I've thought it over well."

On 8 November 1969, Díaz Ordaz officially announced Echeverría as the presidential candidate. Although Echeverría was a hardliner in Díaz Ordaz's administration and considered responsible for the Tlatelolco massacre, he became "immediately obsessed with making people forget that he had ever done it."

Presidency (1970–1976)

Domestic policy

Echeverría was the first president born after the Mexican Revolution.  Once inaugurated as president, he embarked on a massive program of populist political and economic reform, nationalizing the mining and electrical industries, redistributing private land in the states of Sinaloa and Sonora to peasants, imposing limits on foreign investment, and extending Mexico's maritime Economic Exclusion Zone to 200 nautical miles (370 km). State spending on health, housing construction, education, and food subsidies was also significantly increased, and the percentage of the population covered by the social security system was doubled. He enraged the left because he did not bring the perpetrators of the 1971 Corpus Christi massacre to justice.

On 8 October 1974, Echeverría issued a decree creating the new states of Baja California Sur and Quintana Roo, which had previously been federal territories.

Economic issues
After decades of economic growth under his predecessors, the Echeverría administration oversaw an economic crisis during its final months, becoming the first in a series of governments that faced severe economic crises over the ensuing two decades.

During his period in office, the country's external debt soared from US$6 billion in 1970 to US$20 billion in 1976. By 1976, for every dollar that Mexico received from exports, 31 cents had to be allocated to the payment of interest and amortizations on the external debt.

Between 1954 and 1976, successive governments had maintained the value of the peso at 12.50 to the U.S. dollar. On 30 August 1976, as a result of the mounting economic problems, the Echeverría administration devalued the peso by 59.2%, leaving it with a value of 19.90 to the dollar. Two months later, the peso was devalued for a second time, now down to a rate of 26.60 to the dollar. The balance of services, which traditionally had registered surpluses and had been used to partly finance the negative trade balance, entered into deficit for the first time in 1975 and 1976.

Despite this, the Mexican economy grew by 6.1%, and important infrastructure and public works projects were completed after stalling for decades.

Echeverría nationalized the barbasco industry during his tenure. Wild barbasco was the natural source of hormones that were the key component in the contraceptive pill. Nationalization and the creation of the state-run company PROQUIVEMEX came as the importance of Mexico to the industry was waning.

Changes in the electoral system

During Echeverría's administration, a new Federal Election Law was approved which lowered the number of members a party needed to become officially registered from 75,000 to 65,000, introduced a permanent voting card, and
established the minimum age for candidacy for elected office at 21 (down from the previous age of 30).

Following PRI tradition, Echeverría handpicked his successor for the Presidency, and chose his Finance Minister and childhood friend, José López Portillo, to be the PRI's presidential candidate for the 1976 elections. Due to a series of events and an internal conflict in the opposition party PAN, López Portillo was the only candidate in the Presidential election, which he won unopposed.

Environmental policy

The Echeverría government adopted the first national environmental law in 1971. Attention on the environmental impacts came from academics at the National Autonomous University, the National Polytechnic Institute, and the Colegio de México as well as interest in the 1969 U.S. National Environmental Policy Act. The government enacted a series of regulations to control atmospheric pollution, as well as issuing new quality standards for surface and coastal waters. As a structural matter, the government created a new agency to deal with the environment, which in later administrations became a full cabinet-level ministry.

Dirty War and political violence

The Echeverría administration was characterized by growing political violence:
On one hand, several leftist guerrilla groups appeared throughout the country (the most important being those led by Lucio Cabañas and Genaro Vázquez in Guerrero, as well as the urban guerrilla Liga Comunista 23 de Septiembre) in response to the government's authoritarianism and the increasing social inequalities. The activities of these guerrilla groups mostly comprised kidnappings of prominent politicians and businessmen (two of the most famous cases included the kidnapping of José Guadalupe Zuno, who was Echeverría's father-in-law, and the failed kidnapping attempt of Eugenio Garza Sada, which ended in his death) bank robberies and occasional attacks on garrisons. 
And on the other hand, the Government itself violently repressed political dissent. In addition to the notorious 1971 Corpus Christi massacre, the Army was accused of widespread human rights violations (including executions) during the fight against the guerrilla groups. The aforementioned guerrilla leaders Cabañas and Vázquez, both of whom officially died in clashes with the army, are widely suspected of actually having been extrajudicially executed by the armed forces.

Ban on rock music
As a consequence of numerous student and youth protest movements during his administration, President Echeverría attempted to neutralize politicized youth. In late 1971, after the Corpus Christi massacre and the Avándaro Rock Festival, Echeverría famously issued a ban on almost every form of rock music recorded by Mexican bands. The ban (also known as "Avandarazo" because it was in response to the Avándaro Rock Festival, which had been criticized by the conservative sectors of the PRI) included forbidding the recording of most forms of rock music by national groups and the prohibition of its sales in retail stores, as well as forbidding live rock concerts and the airplay of rock songs. International rock music was initially not as affected by this ban, but after a 1975 concert at the Auditorio Nacional in Mexico City by the band Chicago ended with turbulence (due to oversold tickets) and police repression, president Echeverría issued a temporary ban on all concerts by American musicians in Mexico. The ban on domestic rock music lasted for many years, and it only began to be gradually lifted in the 1980s.

Foreign policy

Under the banner of tercermundismo ("Third Worldism"), a reorientation took place in Mexican foreign policy during Echeverría's presidential term. He showed his solidarity with the developing nations and tried to establish Mexico as the defender of Third World interests. The aims of Echeverría's foreign policy were to diversify Mexico's economic links and to fight for a more equal and just international order.

He visited numerous countries and had strong ties with the communist and socialist governments of Cuba and Chile respectively. Echeverría visited Cuba in 1975. Also, Mexico provided political asylum to many political refugees from South American countries who fled their country's repressive military dictatorships; among them Hortensia Bussi, the widow of former Chilean President Salvador Allende. Moreover, he condemned Zionism and allowed the Palestine Liberation Organization to open an office in the capital.

Echeverría used his position as president to promote the Declaration of Mexico on the Equality of Women and Their Contribution to Development and Peace, which was adopted by the 1975 World Conference on Women held in Mexico City. Also in 1975, the Mexican delegation to the United Nations voted in favour of General Assembly Resolution 3379, which equated Zionism with South Africa's apartheid and condemned it as a form of racial discrimination. This resulted in a tourism boycott by the U.S. Jewish community against Mexico, which made visible internal and external conflicts of Echeverría's politics.

Echeverría's presidency rode a wave of anger by citizens in Northwestern Mexico against the United States for its use (and perceived misappropriation) of water from the Colorado River, which drains much of the American Southwest before crossing into Mexico. The established treaty between the U.S. and Mexico called for the U.S. to allow a specified volume of water, to pass the U.S.-Mexican border, but it did not establish any quality levels. Throughout the 20th century, the United States, through its water policy managed by the United States Bureau of Reclamation, had developed wide-ranging irrigation along the river, which had led to progressively higher levels of salinity in the water as it moved downstream. By the late 1960s, the high salinity of the water crossing into Mexico had resulted in the ruin of large tracts of the irrigated land along the lower Colorado.

Failed campaign for United Nations Secretary-General

In 1976, Echeverría sought to parlay his Third World credentials and relationship with the recently deceased Mao Zedong into becoming Secretary-General of the United Nations. Secretary-General Kurt Waldheim of Austria was running for a second term in the 1976 Secretary-General selection. Although Secretaries-General usually run unopposed, the People's Republic of China expressed dissatisfaction that a European headed an organization that had a Third World majority. On 18 October 1976, Echeverría entered the race against Waldheim. He was defeated by a large margin when the Security Council voted on 7 December 1976. 
The PRC did cast one symbolic Security Council veto against Waldheim in the first round, but voted in the Austrian's favor in the second round. Echeverría received only 3 votes to Waldheim's 14, with only Panama abstaining.

1976 election

Echeverría designated José López Portillo, his finance minister,  as the PRI's presidential candidate in the 1976 general election and, in effect, as his successor in the presidency. López Portillo's aides expressed their hope that Echeverría could become Secretary-General of the United Nations so that he would be out of the country for most of López Portillo's term. Echeverría unveiled López Portillo's candidacy on 22 September 1975, choosing him over Porfirio Muñoz Ledo and Interior Minister Mario Moya Palencia. López Portillo and Echeverría were in the same age cohort, but López Portillo was not a practiced politician. He had been groomed from early on in Echeverría's term to be his successor and had no power base himself.  Moya Palencia had the support of many senior PRI politicians and office holders, an independent power base, which put him out of the running for presidential candidacy.

Before the electoral reform of 1977, only four political parties were allowed to participate in the elections: the ruling Institutional Revolutionary Party (PRI), the Popular Socialist Party (PPS), the Authentic Party of the Mexican Revolution (PARM), and the right-wing National Action Party (PAN), the last of which was practically the only real opposition party at the time. The PPS and the PARM supported López Portillo's candidacy, as they had traditionally done with previous candidates for the PRI.

At the time, the opposition PAN was going through internal conflicts and, for the first time since its foundation, it did not nominate a candidate for the 1976 presidential elections, since none of the aspiring candidates achieved a majority of their assembly's votes.

The Mexican Communist Party (PCM) nominated Valentín Campa as its presidential candidate. At the time, the PCM had no official registry and was barred from elections, so Campa's candidacy was not officially recognized and he received no media access. He ran as a write-in candidate.

These factors led to López Portillo effectively running unopposed. His campaign echoed this "unanimous" support for him, and his slogan was "La solución somos todos" ("All of us are the solution"). López Portillo later joked that, due to running without opposition, it would have been enough for "his mother's vote for him" to win the election.

Post-presidency

Continued influence
López Portillo's Minister of the Interior, kept the president abreast of Echeverría's overstepping boundaries, such as use of the presidential telephone network, visits to ministers, and meetings with political elites at his residence. Reyes Heroles took a series of steps to outflank Echeverría, including recording his conversations on the presidential telephone network and suggesting the replacement of officials supportive of Echeverría.

Echeverría was ambassador to Australia and New Zealand from 1978 to 1979.

Despite not keeping influence over López Portillo after their break, Echeverría continued to have influence in Mexico. After leaving office, Carlos Salinas de Gortari, the president from 1988 to 1994, publicly accused Echeverría of inspiring the March 1994 murder of their party's presidential candidate, Luis Donaldo Colosio, and of leading a conspiracy against Salinas's reformist allies in the party, which had led to a systemic political and economic crisis. Salinas claimed that Echeverría pressed him to replace the murdered candidate Colosio with an old-guard figure.

Echeverría's brother-in-law, Rubén Zuno Arce, was convicted by a California court in 1992 and sentenced to life in prison for his role in the Guadalajara drug cartel and the murder of a U.S. federal agent seven years earlier. Echeverría repeatedly requested President Carlos Salinas to pressure Washington for Zuno Arce's release, but to no avail.

After the defeat of the PRI in the general elections of July 2000, it emerged that Vicente Fox (the president from 2000 to 2006) had met privately with Echeverría at the latter's home in Mexico City numerous times during his presidential campaign in 1999 and 2000.

The most controversial was Alejandro Gertz Manero, who had been accused by the Mexican press of bearing responsibility for the suicide of a museum owner in 1972, as Gertz, then working for Echeverría's attorney general, attempted to confiscate his private collection of pre-Hispanic artifacts (Echeverría also had a collection of such artifacts). Fox appointed Gertz as chief of the Federal Police.

Charges
In 2002, Echeverría was the first political official called to testify before the Mexican justice system for the Tlatelolco massacre of students in the Plaza de las Tres Culturas in Tlatelolco in 1968. On 23 July 2006, a special prosecutor indicted Echeverría and requested his arrest for allegedly ordering the attack that killed and wounded many student demonstrators during a protest in Mexico City over education funding on 10 June 1971. The evidence against Echeverría appeared to be based on documents that allegedly show that he ordered the formation of special army units that committed the killings and that he had received regular updates about the episode and its aftermath from his chief of secret police. At the time, the government argued police forces and civilian demonstrators were attacked and people on both sides killed by armed civilians, who were convicted and later freed because of a general amnesty.

After the political transition of 2000, Echeverría was charged with genocide by the special prosecutor, an untested charge in the Mexican legal system, partly because the statute of limitations for charges of homicide had expired (charges of genocide under Mexican law have no statute of limitations since 2002). On 24 July 2004, a judge refused to issue an arrest warrant for Echeverría because of the statute of limitations, apparently rejecting the special prosecutor's assertion of genocide-based special circumstances. The special prosecutor said that he would appeal the judge's decision.

On 24 February 2005, the Supreme Court of Justice decided 4–1 that the statute of limitations (30 years) had expired by the time the prosecution began and that Mexico's ratification by Congress in 2002 of the convention on 26 November 1968, signed by the president on 3 July 1969 but ratified by Congress on 10 December 2001 and coming into effect 90 days later, which states that genocide has no statute of limitations, could not be applied retroactively to Echeverría's case since only Congress can make such agreements part of the legal system. 

While difficult to obtain a prosecution, the prosecution argued before the Supreme Court that political conditions prevented an earlier prosecution, the president was constitutionally protected against charges for his full term so the statute of limitations should be extended, and the UN convention accepted by Mexico covered past events of genocide.

The Supreme Court said that the law did not take into account political conditions and presidential immunity in calculating the statute of limitations, the prosecution failed to prove earlier charges against the defendants (producing only photocopies, with no legal value, of supposed legal proceedings from the late 1970s and early 1980s), and Article 14 of the Constitution bans retroactivity of laws.

On 20 September 2005, the special prosecutor for crimes of the past filed genocide charges against Echeverría for his responsibility, as interior minister at the time, on 2 October 1968 Tlatelolco massacre. Again, the assigned criminal judge dismissed the file and held that the statute of limitations had expired and that the massacre did not constitute genocide. An arrest warrant for Echeverría was issued by a Mexican court on 30 June 2006, but he was found not guilty of the charges on 8 July 2006. On 29 November 2006, he was charged with the massacres and ordered under house arrest by a Mexican judge.

Finally, on 26 March 2009, a federal court ordered Echeverría's absolute freedom and dismissed the charge of genocide for the events of Tlatelolco.

Personal life and death
On 2 January 1945, Echeverría married María Esther Zuno and they had eight children. His son Álvaro Echeverría Zuno, an economist, committed suicide on 19 May 2020, at age 71.

On 15 January 2018, it was reported that he had died, but this was soon discounted. On 17 January, he celebrated his 96th birthday in a hospital and was discharged a day later. He was hospitalized again on 21 June 2018 and was discharged on 10 July.

Echeverría turned 100 on 17 January 2022, and died at his home in Cuernavaca on 8 July. He was cremated in a private memorial service held on 10 July.

Legacy and public opinion
Reporter Martin Walker notes that "Echeverria is hated by Mexico's left, who have sought to bring genocide charges against him as the minister of the interior responsible for the 1968 Olympic Games massacre of students and other protestors near downtown Mexico City. The Right in Mexico blames Echeverría for an economic disaster whose effects are still felt. When Echeverría took office, the Mexican peso was trading at just over 12 to the dollar and there was little foreign debt. He sharply increased indebtedness and eventually the peso collapsed to about one-thousandth of its 1970 exchange rate, wiping out the savings of the middle classes."

In a national survey conducted in 2012 about former presidents, 27% of the respondents considered that the Echeverría administration was "very good" or "good", 16% responded that it was an "average" administration, and 46% responded that it was a "very bad" or "bad" administration. He was the second-worst rated former president in the survey, with only Carlos Salinas de Gortari receiving a lower approval rating.

Honours and awards
 Grand Master of the Order of the Aztec Eagle, Mexico (1970–1976)
  Honorary Knight Grand Cross of The Most Honourable Order of the Bath (1973)
 Knight Grand Cross with Collar of the Order of Merit of the Italian Republic, Italy (8 February 1974)
 Great Star of the Decoration of Honour for Services to the Republic of Austria (1974)
  Honorary Member of the Order of Jamaica

See also

 List of heads of state of Mexico
 List of centenarians (politicians and civil servants)

References

Further reading
Basurto, Jorge. "The Late Populism of Luis Echeverría". In Latin American Populism in Comparative Perspective, edited by Michael L. Conniff, 93-111. Albuquerque: University of New Mexico Press 1982.
 
 Castañeda, Jorge G. Perpetuating Power: How Mexican Presidents Were Chosen. New York: The New Press 2000. 
 Dillingham, A.S. "Mexico's Turn Toward the Third World: Rural Development under President Luis Echevarría" in México Beyond 1968: Revolutionaries, Radicals, and Repression during the Gloabal Sixties and Subversive Seventies. Tucson: University of Arizona Press 2018.
  
Kiddle, Amelia and María L.O. Muñoz, eds. Populism in Twentieth-Century Mexico: The Presidencies of Lázaro Cárdenas and Luis Echeverría. Tucson: University of Arizona Press 2010.

External links
 

|-

1922 births
2022 deaths
Presidents of Mexico
Candidates in the 1970 Mexican presidential election
Institutional Revolutionary Party politicians
Mexican people of Basque descent
Mexican Secretaries of the Interior
Politicians from Mexico City
National Autonomous University of Mexico alumni
Mexican anti-communists
Recipients of the Grand Star of the Decoration for Services to the Republic of Austria
Honorary Knights Grand Cross of the Order of the Bath
Knights Grand Cross with Collar of the Order of Merit of the Italian Republic
Members of the Order of Jamaica
20th-century Mexican politicians
Heads of government who were later imprisoned
Mexican centenarians
Men centenarians